Peter Corsar Anderson (17 February 1871 – 26 August 1955) was an influential educator and golfer in Western Australia.

Tournament wins 
this list is incomplete
1893 The Amateur Championship
1898 Surrey Hills Gentlemen's Championship
1899 Surrey Hills Gentlemen's Championship
1902 Surrey Hills Gentlemen's Championship

Major championships

Amateur wins (1)

Results timeline 
Note: Anderson played in only The Open Championship and The Amateur Championship.

DNP = Did not play
CUT = Missed the cut
"T" indicates a tie for a place
DNQ = Did not qualify for match play portion
Green background for wins. Yellow background for top-10

Source for British Open:  www.opengolf.com

Source for 1894 British Amateur:  The Glasgow Herald, April 26, 1894, pg. 11.

References

Scottish male golfers
Australian male golfers
Amateur golfers
Australian headmasters
People educated at Madras College
Sportspeople from Geelong
British emigrants to Australia
1871 births
1955 deaths